Fakr al-Din Shaddad ibn Mahmud was the Kurdish Shaddadid emir of Ani from sometime after 1131 until 1155.

Fakr al-Din Shaddad b. Mahmud spent most of his reign in attempts to fend off the resurgent Georgians. To this end, he sought to forge a marital alliance with the Saltukids of Erzurum and even tried to sell them Ani, but he eventually defected the Saltukids to King Demetrius I of Georgia. A revolt in Ani forced Fakr al-Din Shaddad into exile in the Ayyubid state in Syria. He spent his last years, living near Ani, but without entertaining power. His successor was his brother, Fadl V.

References 

Shaddadid emirs of Ani
12th-century rulers in Asia
12th-century Kurdish people